James Agar is the name of:
 James Agar, 1st Viscount Clifden (1735–1788), Irish peer and politician
 James Agar, 3rd Earl of Normanton (1818–1896), British Conservative Party politician
 James Agar (1672–1733), Irish politician
 James Agar (1713–1769), Irish politician
 James Agar (priest) (1781–1866), Anglican priest in Ireland